Las Vegas is one of seven parishes (administrative divisions) in the Corvera de Asturias municipality, within the province and autonomous community of Asturias, in northern Spain. 

The population is 7,713.

Villages
La Estrada
Las Vegas

References

Parishes in Corvera de Asturias